Alexander Carter  (16 April 1909 – 17 February 2002) was a Canadian bishop, who served as head of the Roman Catholic Diocese of Sault Sainte Marie, Ontario from 1958 to 1985.

Biography
Born in Montreal, Quebec, the brother of Cardinal Gerald Emmett Carter, he was ordained a priest in 1936. From 1958 to 1985, he was the bishop of Sault Sainte Marie. He was the chancellor of the University of Sudbury between 1960 and 1986. In 1989, he was made an Officer of the Order of Canada. He died at North Bay, Ontario.

In 1994, his memoir, Alex Carter: A Canadian Bishop's Memoirs, was published.

Bishop Alexander Carter Catholic Secondary School in Hanmer, Ontario is named in his honour.

References
 

1909 births
2002 deaths
Canadian university and college chancellors
Officers of the Order of Canada
Canadian memoirists
Participants in the Second Vatican Council
Clergy from Montreal
Writers from Montreal
Roman Catholic bishops of Sault Sainte Marie, Ontario
20th-century Roman Catholic bishops in Canada
20th-century memoirists